The Freeway Killer was a collective epithet given by the media and the police to what the media believed was a single serial killer claiming young male victims, predominantly in California during the 1970s and early 1980s, and who often discarded the victims' bodies alongside or upon freeways. However, there turned out to be three Freeway Killers who operated independently of each other, but just happened to select similar victims from similar locations.

The three killers were:

 Patrick Kearney (born 1939), age 37 when captured in 1977
 William Bonin (1947–1996) and several accomplices, age 33 when captured in 1980
 Randy Kraft (born 1945), age 38 when captured in 1983

See also 

 Southside Slayer
 Southside Strangler (Chicago)

American murderers of children
American rapists
American serial killers
Child sexual abuse in the United States
Crimes in California
Gay men
People convicted of murder by California
Male serial killers
Violence against men in North America